The Mongolia Fed Cup team represents Mongolia in Fed Cup tennis competition and are governed by the Mongolian Tennis Association. They took part in the Fed Cup for the first time in 2020, competing in the Asia/Oceania Zone Group II.

Players

See also
 Fed Cup
 Mongolia at the Davis Cup

References

External links
 

Billie Jean King Cup teams
Fed Cup
Fed Cup